Kiss Me General (original title: Martin Soldat) is a 1966 French comedy film directed by Michel Deville and starring Robert Hirsch, Véronique Vendell, Walter Rilla, Marlène Jobert and Anthony Sharp. An actor disguises himself as a soldier during the Second World War, but is mistaken for a soldier and becomes a war hero during the Allied Liberation of France in 1944.

Cast
 Robert Hirsch - Martin
 Véronique Vendell - Zouzou
 Walter Rilla - Général von Haffelrats
 Marlène Jobert - La résistante
 Anthony Sharp - Major
 Reinhard Kolldehoff - Le chef de la Gestapo
 Paul-Emile Deiber - Le général de Lamarzelle
 Adrien Cayla-Legrand - Charles De Gaulle.

References

External links 
 

1966 films
1966 comedy films
French comedy films
1960s French-language films
Films directed by Michel Deville
Western Front of World War II films
Cultural depictions of Charles de Gaulle
1960s French films